Plymouth Northside Historic District is a national historic district located at Plymouth, Marshall County, Indiana.  The district encompasses 141 contributing buildings, 2 contributing sites, 6 contributing structures, and 3 contributing objects in a predominantly residential section of Plymouth.  It developed between about 1870 and 1940, and includes examples of Italianate, Gothic Revival, Queen Anne, Colonial Revival, Tudor Revival, Neoclassical, and Renaissance Revival style architecture.  Located in the district is the separately listed Marshall County Courthouse.  Other notable contributing resources include Magnetic Park (c. 1885, 1937), First United Methodist Church (1914-1915), J.C. Capron House (1900), Samuel Schlosser House (1910-1911), Clay Metsker House (1917-1918), Plymouth Church of the Brethren (1950-1951), Logan-Stanley Fountain (c. 1902), Stevens House (1895), and First Presbyterian Church (1896-1897).

It was listed on the National Register of Historic Places in 2013.

See also
East Laporte Street Footbridge
Marshall County Courthouse (Indiana)
Plymouth Downtown Historic District
Plymouth Northside Historic District
Plymouth Southside Historic District
Plymouth Fire Station

References

Historic districts on the National Register of Historic Places in Indiana
Gothic Revival architecture in Indiana
Colonial Revival architecture in Indiana
Tudor Revival architecture in Indiana
Renaissance Revival architecture in Indiana
Italianate architecture in Indiana
Queen Anne architecture in Indiana
Historic districts in Marshall County, Indiana
National Register of Historic Places in Marshall County, Indiana
2013 establishments in Indiana